Dale Allan Watkins (born 4 November 1971) is an English former footballer who played as a forward.

Career
Watkins began his career with Sheffield United. In 1991, Watkins signed for hometown club Peterborough United. At Peterborough, Watkins made ten Football League appearances, before dropping into Non-League football, playing for Peterborough City, Wisbech Town and Grantham Town.

In January 1993, Watkins signed for Rushden & Diamonds. On 19 January 1993, Watkins scored a hat-trick on his full debut against Hinckley Town. Following the signing of Carl Alford in 1996, Watkins became surplus to requirements at the club and subsequently signed for Gloucester City. During Watkins' time at Rushden & Diamonds, he scored 98 goals in 162 appearances in all competitions. At Gloucester, Watkins scored 35 goals in 52 appearances in all competitions in his single season at the club. In 1997, Watkins moved across Gloucestershire, signing for Cheltenham Town. Watkins enjoyed a successful spell whilst at Cheltenham, scoring 29 goals in his first season, winning the 1998 FA Trophy Final and winning the 1998–99 Football Conference. Following a four-game loan spell with Kettering Town in the winter of 1999, Watkins joined the club permanently on 23 December 1999. Watkins made 71 league appearances, scoring 14 times for the club.

In 2002, Watkins signed for Chelmsford City. During his time at the club, Watkins went out on loan to Grantham and King's Lynn, before joining the latter permanently. Following a spell at King's Lynn, Watkins joined Stamford, having spells out on loan with Yaxley and Blackstones, before joining Yaxley permanently in 2006.

References

1971 births
Living people
Association football forwards
English footballers
Sportspeople from Peterborough
Sheffield United F.C. players
Grimsby Town F.C. players
Rotherham United F.C. players
Peterborough United F.C. players
Wisbech Town F.C. players
Grantham Town F.C. players
Rushden & Diamonds F.C. players
Gloucester City A.F.C. players
Cheltenham Town F.C. players
Kettering Town F.C. players
Chelmsford City F.C. players
King's Lynn F.C. players
Stamford A.F.C. players
Yaxley F.C. players
Blackstones F.C. players
English Football League players
National League (English football) players
England youth international footballers
England semi-pro international footballers